Matthew Beniers (born November 5, 2002) is an American professional ice hockey center for the Seattle Kraken of the National Hockey League (NHL). The Kraken drafted Beniers second overall in the 2021 NHL Entry Draft with their first-ever selection in an entry draft. He played college ice hockey at Michigan.

Early life
Beniers grew up in Hingham, Massachusetts, where he started skating and playing hockey at a young age.

Playing career

Junior
During the 2018–19 season, in his first season with the USA Hockey National Team Development Program of the United States Hockey League (USHL), Beniers recorded 10 goals and 13 assists in 42 games. During the 2019–20 season, Beniers was alternate captain for the USA Hockey National Team Development Program, where he ranked second on the team in scoring with 18 goals and 23 assists in 44 games.

Collegiate
Beniers was committed to play ice hockey for Harvard; however, after the Ivy League cancelled their season due to the COVID-19 pandemic, he enrolled at Michigan in August 2020. Beniers began his collegiate career for the Michigan Wolverines during the 2020–21 season. He recorded 10 goals and 14 assists in 24 games during his freshman season. He led the conference in on-ice rating with a +21, ranking him eighth nationally. He led first-time NHL Draft-eligible NCAA players in goals, goals per game (0.42), and shots on goal per game. His 24 points ranked third in the league in freshmen scoring and fourth nationally. He recorded his first career goal in his first game of the season.

On February 26, 2021, he recorded his first career hat-trick in a game against Arizona State. He was subsequently named the Big Ten Third Star of the Week for the week ending March 1. On March 5, he recorded his first career four-point game, with one goal and three assists in a game against Minnesota. He was subsequently named the Big Ten Third Star of the Week for the week ending March 9. Following the season, he was named to the All-Big Ten Freshman Team and the College Hockey News All-Rookie Team. 

On August 20, 2021, the Wolverines announced that Beniers would return for the 2021–22 season. During his sophomore year, he was the Big Ten Scoring Champion, as he recorded 27 points in 20 conference games. He had 10 multiple-point conference games. He led Michigan in scoring with 20 goals and 23 assists for 43 points in 37 games. Following an outstanding season, he was named a unanimous selection to the All-Big Ten First Team, and a finalist for the Big Ten Player of the Year. He was also named a finalist for the Hobey Baker Award and an AHCA West First Team All-American.

Professional

Beniers entered the 2021 NHL Entry Draft as one of the consensus top prospects, and was ultimately selected second overall by the Seattle Kraken, becoming the expansion team's first-ever draft selection. On April 10, 2022, Beniers signed a three-year, entry-level contract with the Kraken. He had been uncertain whether he would turn professional or return to the University of Michigan for another year, but ultimately opted to sign, following discussions with his family, Kraken general manager Ron Francis, and new teammate Ryan Donato. 

Making his NHL debut on April 12, 2022, two days after his contract signing, Beniers recorded his first NHL assist in a 5–3 loss to the Calgary Flames. He described being "excited about how all right I felt" during his first appearance in the league. Beniers scored his first NHL goal in an April 16, 2022 win at home against the New Jersey Devils. Beniers ended the season with three goals and nine points through 10 NHL games. On January 5, 2023, Beniers was named to the 2023 NHL All-Star Game. On January 30, 2023, it was announced Beniers would miss the All-Star Game due to an injury.

International play

Beniers represented the United States at the 2019 IIHF World U18 Championships, where he recorded two goals in seven games and won a bronze medal. Beniers represented the United States at the 2021 World Junior Ice Hockey Championships, where he was the youngest player on the roster, scoring one goal and two assists and averaging 17:05 of ice time in seven games as a second-line center, helping the United States win gold. 

Beniers represented the United States at the 2021 IIHF World Championship, where he was the only draft-eligible player on Team USA and won a bronze medal. He became the fifth Wolverine to represent their country at both the World Junior and World Championship in the same season, following Jack Johnson (2007), Jacob Trouba (2013), Dylan Larkin (2015) and Quinn Hughes (2018 and 2019).

Beniers represented the United States at the 2022 Winter Olympics with one goal and one assist in four games and finished in fifth place.

Career statistics

Regular season and playoffs

International

Awards and honors

References

External links
 

2002 births
Living people
AHCA Division I men's ice hockey All-Americans
Ice hockey players at the 2022 Winter Olympics
Ice hockey players from Massachusetts
Michigan Wolverines men's ice hockey players
National Hockey League first-round draft picks
Olympic ice hockey players of the United States
People from Hingham, Massachusetts
Seattle Kraken draft picks
Seattle Kraken players
USA Hockey National Team Development Program players